The Daily Texan is the student newspaper of the University of Texas at Austin. It is one of the largest college newspapers in the United States, with a daily circulation of roughly 12,000 during the fall and spring semesters, and it is among the oldest student newspapers in the South.

The Texan is entirely student-run and independent from the university, although its operations are overseen by Texas Student Media, an entity with faculty, student, and newspaper industry representatives.

The paper has won more national, regional, and state awards than any other college newspaper in America and counts 25 Pulitzer Prize winners among its former staffers.

History
The Texan's origins date back to October 1900, with the merger of two privately owned weekly newspapers, The Ranger (est. 1897) (which had succeeded The Alcalde, which published from 1895–1897) and The Ranger and the Calendar (1889–1900). In 1902 The Texan was taken over by the Student Association. From 1900–1907, the newspaper came out weekly; and from 1907–1913 The Texan was published semiweekly. In 1913, the student body voted to publish the paper each weekday, and The Daily Texan was born on September 24, 1913.

In 2008 The Daily Texan was one of three student newspapers that owned and operated its own printing press. Originally acquired in 1973 for $222,000, the press was put on the market in 2009. In May 2009, the Austin American-Statesman began printing The Daily Texan. As of October 2019, New Braunfels Herald-Zeitung prints and distributes the papers.

Staff

Historically, writers for the Daily Texan have been paid much less than the minimum wage. Most Journalism students — who are in the same complex — can’t contribute to the Texan due to their course workload and the poor pay offered by the Texan. Historically, the position of editor of The Daily Texan has been elected. The logic of an elected editor historically has been based on the newspaper’s having been founded and owned by students and then given over to the student body. More recently, it has been argued that because students were compelled to fund the paper through the payment of mandatory student service fees, they should have some say in the paper’s overall direction. In addition, the elected editor has been seen as a way to protect the paper from institutional censorship from the university. Since the student body selects the editor of the paper, this ensures that the university administration cannot install an editor sympathetic to its views and thereby control the content of the newspaper.

In modern times, editorial candidates have been screened by the Texas Student Publications Board (now known as Texas Student Media), an entity with faculty, student, and newspaper industry representatives. The TSM Board publishes a handbook which sets forth the requirements an editorial candidate must meet before his or her name may be placed on the ballot. The board has been resistant to the idea of an elected editor and has made several attempts to convert the position to an appointed one. The most recent attempt, led by the board president, was in 2005.

The TSM Board currently appoints the managing editor, who oversees the daily operation of the paper while the elected editor generally stewards the editorial page. However, the elected editor retains the final say over the content of the newspaper.

Awards
The Texan has won many prestigious awards, including the Associated Collegiate Press’ "Pacemaker Award" in 1965, 1969, 1971 and 1985, and the Columbia Scholastic Press’ Gold Crown Award in 1984, 1985, 1989, 1990, 1991, 1993, 1994, 1995, 1997, 2005 and 2006. Most recently the Texan won TAPME’s Daily Newspaper of the Year Award for 2016.

Notable staff alumni

A number of comic artists who began at the Texan have gone on to attain commercial success. The most notable of these are Chris Ware, creator of Jimmy Corrigan, the Smartest Kid on Earth; Berkeley Breathed, creator of Academia Waltz, the predecessor to Bloom County; and Robert Rodriguez, director of Sin City. Hepcats by Martin Wagner and Eyebeam by Sam Hurt also found continued success after their creators left the University of Texas at Austin. Numerous Texan cartoonists have later worked in animation, among them Divya Srinivasan, the author of Little Owl’s Night and other children’s picture books.

See also

List of college newspapers

References
Notes

Bibliography

External links
The Daily Texan

Editors of The Daily Texan — compiled by John Economidy

1900 establishments in Texas
Newspapers published in Austin, Texas
Newspapers established in 1900
Student newspapers published in Texas
Texas Student Media
Daily newspapers published in Texas